Louise de Marillac , also Louise Le Gras, (August 12, 1591 – March 15, 1660) was the co-founder, with Vincent de Paul, of the Daughters of Charity. She is venerated as a saint by the Catholic Church and the Episcopal Church in the United States of America.

Early life
Louise de Marillac was born out of wedlock on August 12, 1591 near Le Meux, now in the department of Oise, in Picardy. She never knew her mother. Louis de Marillac, Lord of Ferrires (1556-1604), claimed her as his natural daughter yet not his legal heir. Louis was a member of the prominent de Marillac family and was a widower at the time of Louise's birth. Her uncle, Michel de Marillac, was a major figure in the court of Queen Marie de' Medici and, though Louise was not a member of the Queen's court, she lived and worked among the French aristocracy.  When her father married his new wife, Antoinette Le Camus, she refused to accept Louise as part of their family. Thus Louise grew up amid the affluent society of Paris, but without a stable home life. Nevertheless, she was cared for and received an excellent education at the royal monastery of Poissy near Paris, where her aunt was a Dominican nun.

Louise remained at Poissy until her father's death, when she was twelve years old. She then stayed with a devout spinster, from whom she learned household management skills as well as the secrets of herbal medicine. Around the age of fifteen, Louise felt drawn to the cloistered life. She later made application to the Capuchin nuns in Paris but was refused admission. It is not clear if her refusal was for her continual poor health or other reasons, but her spiritual director assured her that God had "other plans" for her.

Devastated by this refusal, Louise was at a loss as to her next step. When she was 22, her family convinced her that marriage was the best alternative. Her uncle arranged for her to marry Antoine Le Gras, secretary to Queen Marie. Antoine was an ambitious young man who seemed destined for great accomplishments. Louise and Antoine were wed in the fashionable Church of St. Gervaise on February 5, 1613. In October, the couple had their only child, Michel. Louise grew to love Antoine and was an attentive mother to their son. Along with being devoted to her family, Louise was also active in ministry in her parish. She had a leading role in the Ladies of Charity, an organization of wealthy women dedicated to assisting those suffering from poverty and disease.

Family and personal troubles
During civil unrest, her two uncles who held high rank within the government were imprisoned. One was publicly executed, and the other died in prison. Around 1621, Antoine contracted a chronic illness and eventually became bedridden. Louise nursed and cared for him and their child. In 1623, when illness was wasting Antoine, depression was overcoming Louise In addition, she suffered for years with internal doubt and guilt for having not pursued the religious calling she had felt as a young woman. She was fortunate to have a wise and sympathetic counsellor, Francis de Sales, then in Paris, and then his friend, the bishop of Belley.

Decision on life
In 1623, at 32, she wrote,

She vowed not to remarry if her husband died before her. She also believed that she had received the insight that she would be guided to a new spiritual director whose face she was shown. When she happened to meet Vincent de Paul, she recognized him as the priest from her vision.

Three years after this experience, Antoine died. Being a woman of energy, intelligence, determination and devotion, Louise wrote her own "Rule of Life in the World" that detailed a structure for her day. Time was set aside for reciting the Little Office of the Blessed Virgin Mary, attending Mass, receiving Holy Communion, meditation, spiritual reading, fasting, penance, reciting the rosary and special prayers. Still, Louise managed to find time to maintain her household, entertain guests and nurture Michel, her 13-year-old son, with special needs.

Meeting Vincent de Paul

Antoine died in 1625. Widowed and lacking financial means, she had to move. Vincent lived near her new dwelling. At first, he was reluctant to be her confessor, as he was busy with his Confraternities of Charity. Members were aristocratic ladies of charity, who were helping him nurse the poor and look after neglected children, a real need of the day, but the ladies were busy with many of their own concerns and duties. His work needed many more helpers, especially ones who were peasants themselves and so would be closer to the poor. He also needed someone who could teach and organize them.

Over the next four years, Vincent and Louise often met and communicated by letters. Vincent guided Louise to  a greater balance in a life of moderation, peace and calm. In 1629, Vincent invited Louise to become involved in his work with the Confraternities of Charity. She found great success in these endeavors. Then, in 1632, Louise made a spiritual retreat. Her intuition led her to understand that it was time to intensify her ministry with poor and needy persons. Louise, now forty-two years old, communicated this objective to Monsieur Vincent.

Company of the Daughters of Charity of St. Vincent de Paul

In 17th-century France, the charitable care of the poor was completely unorganized. The Ladies of Charity, founded by Vincent years earlier, provided some care and monetary resources, but it was far from enough. They had the funds to aid poor people, but they did not have the time or temperament to live a life of service among the poor.

Vincent and Louise realized that direct service of the poor was not easy for the nobility or the bourgeoisie because of social class. The women took meals, distributed clothing and gave care and comfort. They visited the slums dressed in beautiful dresses next to people considered to be peasants. The tension, between the ideal of service and social constraints, was real. Besides, the families of the ladies often opposed the works. It soon became clear that many of the ladies were unfit to cope with the actual conditions.

While the aristocratic ladies were better suited to the work of raising money and dealing with correspondence, the practical work of nursing the poor in their own homes, and caring for neglected children was best accomplished by women of a similar social status to those served.

The need of organization in work for the poor suggested to de Paul the forming of a confraternity among the women of his parish in Châtillon-les-Dombes. It was so successful that it spread from the rural districts to Paris, where noble ladies often found it hard to give personal care to the needs of the poor. The majority sent their servants to minister to those in need, but often, the work was considered unimportant. Vincent de Paul remedied it by referring young women who inquired about serving persons in need to go to Paris and devote themselves to the ministry under the direction of the Ladies of Charity. These young girls formed the nucleus of the Daughters of Charity of St. Vincent de Paul.

Louise found the help she needed in young, humble country women, who had the energy and the proper attitude to deal with people weighed down by destitution and suffering. She began working with a group of them and saw a need for common life and formation. Consequently, she invited four country girls to live in her home in the Rue des Fosses‐Saint‐Victor and began training them to care for those in need.

Mobility was a major innovation. The Daughters of Charity were unlike other established religious communities, whose religious women were behind cloister walls in a monastery and performed a ministry of contemplative prayer. "Love the poor and honor them as you would honor Christ Himself," Louise explained. That was the foundation of the Company of the Daughters of Charity, which received official approbation in 1655. Their distinctive habit, a grey wool tunic with a large headdress or cornette of white linen, was the usual dress of Breton peasant women of the 17th century and later.

At first, the Company served the needs of the sick and poor in their homes. Louise's work with these young women developed into a system of pastoral care at the Hôtel-Dieu, the oldest and largest hospital in Paris. Their work became well-known, and the Daughters were invited to Angers to take over management of the nursing services of the hospital there. As it was the first ministry outside Paris for the fledgling community, Louise made the arduous journey there in the company of three nuns.

After completing negotiations with the city officials and the hospital managers, Louise instituted collaboration among the doctors, nurses and others to form a comprehensive team. The model was highly successful and is still in use today by the Daughters of Charity. Under her guidance, they expanded their scope of service to include orphanages, institutions for the elderly and mentally ill, prisons and the battlefield.

In working with her sisters, Louise emphasized a balanced life, as Vincent de Paul had taught her. It was the integration of contemplation and activity that made Louise's work so successful. She wrote near the end of her life, "Certainly it is the great secret of the spiritual life to abandon to God all that we love by abandoning ourselves to all that He wills."

Louise led the Company of Daughters until her death. Nearing her death, she wrote to her nuns: "Take good care of the service of the poor. Above all, live together in great union and cordiality, loving one another in imitation of the union and life of our Lord. Pray earnestly to the Blessed Virgin, that she might be your only Mother."

After increasingly ill health, Louise de Marillac died six months before the death of her dear friend and mentor, Vincent de Paul. She was 68, and the Daughters of Charity had more than 40 houses in France. The nuns have always been held in high repute and have made foundations in all parts of the world.

Spirituality

Aided by her directors, the young Louise had entered into profound prayer in the tradition of the Rhenish-Flemish spiritualists, and had been introduced to the French school of spirituality of Cardinal Pierre de Bérulle. Louise, like Duns Scotus, viewed the Incarnation as the moment in which men and women were saved. In the 17th century in France, there was discussion about the condemnation of Quietism so from the time of her death, mysticism was viewed with suspicion. In light of this, her biographer, Nicholas Gobillon, removed any traces of mysticism from Louise's writings and rewrote her meditations.

Veneration

Louise de Marillac was beatified by Pope Benedict XV in 1920 and, on March 11, 1934, she was canonized by Pope Pius XI. Her feast day is May 4 (March 15 until 2016). Her remains are enshrined in the chapel of the motherhouse of the Daughters of Charity at 140 rue du Bac, Paris. She is mistakenly referred to as an incorrupt saint; the body enshrined in the chapel is actually a wax effigy, containing her bones. She was declared Patroness of Christian Social Workers by Pope John XXIII, in 1960. Louise de Marillac is honored with a Lesser Feast on the liturgical calendar of the Episcopal Church in the United States of America on March 15.

Namesakes
 St. Louise de Marillac Parish is in Pittsburgh, Pennsylvania.
 St. Louise de Marillac Parish is in Bellevue, Washington.
 St. Louise de Marillac Parish and School are in LaGrange Park, Illinois.
 St Louise's Comprehensive College is in Falls Road, Belfast, Northern Ireland.
 St. Louise de Marillac Parish in Covina, California.
 St. Louise de Marillac Parish is in Montreal, Quebec.
 St. Louise de Marillac Primary School is in Ballyfermot, Dublin.
 Marillac Medical Clinic for the Poor in Grand Junction, Colorado.
 Parroquia Santa Luisa de Marillac Santo Domingo, Republica Dominicana
 The Church of St Vincent de Paul and St Louise of Marillac served Potters Bar in Hertfordshire from 1962 until 2005.

References

External links

Company of the Daughters of Charity
The Vincentian Center for Church and Society
Catholic Online Saints
Vincentian Studies Institute
Founder Statue in St Peter's Basilica

1591 births
1660 deaths
People from Oise
French nurses
French women nurses
Daughters and Sisters of Charity of St. Vincent de Paul
French Roman Catholic saints
Vincentian saints
Founders of Catholic religious communities
16th-century Christian saints
17th-century Christian saints
Christian female saints of the Early Modern era
Anglican saints